Doink may refer to:

 An often used ominous sound in the TV show Law & Order, stylized as doink doink or chung CHUNG
 Doink, an episode of The Marvelous Mrs. Maisel
 Doink the Clown, a professional wrestling persona
 The Double Doink, a blocked game-winning field goal attempt in the 2018 NFC Wild Card game
 The Doink Years, a 1996 album by The Grifters